Lars Arne Frölander (born 26 May 1974) is a Swedish swimmer. He has competed in six consecutive Olympic Games (1992, 1996, 2000, 2004, 2008 and 2012).

Biography
Frölander was born in Boden. He grew up in Ornäs in Borlänge Municipality.

In the 1992 Summer Olympics, he competed in the 4 × 200 metre freestyle relay along with Christer Wallin, Anders Holmertz and Tommy Werner. The Swedish team finished second behind the Unified Team.

In the 1996 Summer Olympics, Frölander again finished second in the 4 × 200 metre freestyle relay with the Swedish team. The team consisted of Christer Wallin, Anders Holmertz, Frölander, Anders Lyrbring. This time the United States was the winning team. Frölander also competed in the 100 metre freestyle, where he finished ninth in the heats but scratched the B-final, and in the 100 metre butterfly event, where he finished 19th.

The highlight of his career was when he won the gold in the 100 metre butterfly event at the Sydney Olympic Games in September 2000. A couple of months earlier he twice broke the world record in the men's 100 m butterfly (short course). Frölander was awarded the Svenska Dagbladet Gold Medal in 2000 as a result of his gold medal victory in Sydney.

At the 2012 Summer Olympics, Frölander, age 38, posted a 52.47 in the opening heats of the 100 m butterfly, less than 1 second slower than top qualifier Chad le Clos, but 0.12 s too slow to advance to the semifinals.

Personal bests

Long course (50 m)

Short course (25 m)

Clubs
 Borlänge SS
 Sundsvalls SS (1996–2001)
 Linköpings ASS (2001–)

References

External links
 Profile at FINA
 

1974 births
Living people
People from Boden Municipality
Swedish male freestyle swimmers
Swedish male butterfly swimmers
Olympic swimmers of Sweden
Swimmers at the 1992 Summer Olympics
Swimmers at the 1996 Summer Olympics
Swimmers at the 2000 Summer Olympics
Swimmers at the 2004 Summer Olympics
Swimmers at the 2008 Summer Olympics
Swimmers at the 2012 Summer Olympics
Olympic gold medalists for Sweden
Olympic silver medalists for Sweden
World record setters in swimming
World Aquatics Championships medalists in swimming
Medalists at the FINA World Swimming Championships (25 m)
European Aquatics Championships medalists in swimming
SMU Mustangs men's swimmers
Southern Methodist University alumni
Borlänge SS swimmers
Sundsvalls SS swimmers
Linköpings ASS swimmers
Medalists at the 2000 Summer Olympics
Medalists at the 1996 Summer Olympics
Medalists at the 1992 Summer Olympics
Olympic gold medalists in swimming
Olympic silver medalists in swimming
Goodwill Games medalists in swimming
Competitors at the 2001 Goodwill Games
Sportspeople from Norrbotten County
20th-century Swedish people
21st-century Swedish people